The sixth season of the American adult animated television series Rick and Morty premiered on September 4, 2022. Starring Justin Roiland as both titular characters, Rick Sanchez and Morty Smith, and their inter-dimensional counterparts, the season was ordered before the fourth season of the show finished airing, in May 2020. It is the final season to feature Roiland providing any voice work and is also the final season to be produced by Justin Roiland's Solo Vanity Card Productions, as he was fired from the show on January 24, 2023 due to domestic battery allegations.

Cast and characters

Main
 Justin Roiland as Rick Sanchez and Morty Smith, the main characters of the series.
 Chris Parnell as Jerry Smith, Morty's and Summer's father and Rick's son-in-law.
 Spencer Grammer as Summer Smith, Morty's older sister and Rick's granddaughter.
 Sarah Chalke as Beth Smith, Morty's and Summer's mother and Rick's daughter.

Recurring
 Keith David as United States President Curtis / The President, the President of the United States and erstwhile frenemy of Rick.
 Paul Giamatti as Story Lord, the former conductor of the Story Train, written out of the fourth wall into a real dimension.

Guest
 Kari Wahlgren as D.I.A.N.E., an AI made by Rick to impersonate his long deceased wife, Diane.
 Peter Dinklage as Chans, the leader of a group of alien terrorists, based on Hans Gruber from the 1988 action film Die Hard.
 Heather Anne Campbell as Jennith Padrow-Chunt, the CEO of a fortune cookie factory.
 James Adomian as Old M. Hucksbee, the caretaker of the Lockerean.
 Patricia Lentz as Joyce Smith, Jerry's mother.
 Lisa Kudrow as a technologically-advanced Tyrannosaurus who returns to Earth.
 Jason Mraz as a technologically-advanced Brachiosaurus who returns to Earth.
 Dan Harmon as:
 A technologically-advanced Triceratops who returns to Earth.
 Mr. Nimbus, an aquatic character who can control marine life and policemen.
 Christopher Meloni as Jesus Christ, a fictional personified version of Jesus Christ brought into reality.
 Jeff Loveness as Marvin
 Susan Sarandon as Dr. Wong, the Smith family's therapist.
 Diedrich Bader as Blagnar the Eternal, the head of a council of intergalactic superheroes.
 Will Forte as Eugene Michael Piss / Pissmaster, an alien who wears a flying suit that enables him to shoot urine against an opponent.
 John Early as Cookie Magneto, a parody of Magneto who controls cookies.
 Jack Black as a Viscount of Venus.
 Daniel Radcliffe, Matt King, David Mitchell, and Robert Webb as the Knights of the Sun.

Episodes

Production

Development
The season is a part of a long-term deal between show creators Justin Roiland and Dan Harmon and Adult Swim, confirming 70 new episodes would be released over an unspecified amount of seasons. Ten of those episodes were aired as season four, and ten more were aired as season five, leaving fifty episodes remaining. In February 2020, Roiland announced that the sixth season of Rick and Morty was underway.

Casting
Along with the season's announcement, regulars Justin Roiland, Chris Parnell, Spencer Grammer, and Sarah Chalke were confirmed to return as the Smith family. The second episode of the season, "Rick: A Mort Well Lived", featured Peter Dinklage as a guest star.

Writing
Writing for the series continued over Zoom during the COVID-19 pandemic, and Dan Harmon said that production was "pretty far along" by November 2020. In March 2021, Harmon confirmed that they were "very late" in the writing process.

Roiland's dismissal
On January 24, 2023, amid felony charges against Justin Roiland, it was announced that Adult Swim had cut ties with Roiland and that he was fired from the show. This makes the final season where Roiland does any work on the show, including voicing both Rick and Morty and is also the final season to be produced by Justin Roiland's Solo Vanity Card Productions.

Release
The season premiered on September 4, 2022 on Adult Swim. It is currently available for pre-order in DVD and standard Blu-ray formats, as well as a SteelBook Blu-ray form.

Reception

On the review aggregator Rotten Tomatoes, season 6 has a 91% score based on 62 reviews. The site's critic consensus reads, "Bookended by some memorable serialized developments, Rick and Morty's sixth season has a lot of fun in between as it explores whether the universe's most toxic genius can actually grow as a person." On Metacritic, the season has a score of 86, out of 4 reviews, indicating "universal acclaim". The season was nominated at the Artios Awards for Outstanding Achievement in Casting – Animated Series.

Notes

References

External links
 

Rick and Morty seasons
2022 American television seasons